Dimethyladenosine transferase 1, mitochondrial; Transcription factor B1, mitochondrial is a mitochondrial enzyme that in is encoded by the TFB1M gene.

TFB1M is a mitochondrial methyltransferase, which uses S-adenosyl methionine to dimethylate two highly conserved adenosine residues at the 3'-end of the mitochondrial 12S rRNA thereby regulating the assembly or stability of the small subunit of the mitochondrial ribosome.

Additionally, TFB1M has been demonstrated to stimulate transcription from promoter templates in an in vitro system containing recombinant mitochondrial RNA polymerase and TFAM. There are no experimental data demonstrating that this function occurs in vivo; the paralogous TFB2M is more specific for this role.

Interactions
TFB1M has been shown to interact with TFAM.

References

Further reading